Clairaut's formula may refer to:
Clairaut's equation (mathematical analysis)
Clairaut's relation (differential geometry)
Clairaut's theorem (calculus)
Clairaut's theorem (gravity)